Charles "Chuck" Kaiton is the former radio play-by-play announcer for the Carolina Hurricanes of the National Hockey League. He was with the team since the 1979–80 season, their first in the NHL while they were still the Hartford Whalers.  He never missed a game in the team's NHL history; the franchise came over from the World Hockey Association in the same year Kaiton became their announcer.

Career

Kaiton began his broadcasting career in 1969 at his alma mater, the University of Michigan, and then, in 1975 moved on to broadcast sports at the University of Wisconsin–Madison. In 1979, he was named Wisconsin's Sportscaster of the Year. That same year, he made the jump to the NHL, joining the Hartford Whalers and following them to North Carolina in 1997–98.  In 1986, he was elected president of the NHL Broadcasters Association.

Unlike most broadcasters, who typically work in tandem with an analyst or color commentator, Kaiton normally called games alone. However, John Forslund, the Hurricanes television play-by-play broadcaster, joined him when he was not needed for a broadcast. This only typically happened during the postseason.

Kaiton was widely considered one of the best broadcasters in the league.  Much of his acclaim came from having been heard across much of the eastern half of North America on Hartford's WTIC for most of the team's run in New England.  His trademark was the use of large words, such as triskaidekaphobia whenever any number 13 comes up, as well as his exuberant calls of the most exciting moments of the game. He was known for calling opposing teams' goals as loudly as Hurricanes' goals.

However, his most well known trait is the proper pronunciation of player names, as opposed to using the Anglicized version most broadcasters use. He ensures accurate pronunciation of names by talking to the players themselves. For instance, while most broadcasters pronounced Frantisek Kaberle's name Ka-ber-LEE, Kaiton used the correct Czech pronunciation Ka-ber-LUH.

Kaiton has always wished to help fans better understand the idiosyncrasies of the game. To achieve this end, he has a segment during the second intermission of every broadcast called "Kaiton's Corner", where he answers questions e-mailed by fans. These questions range from rules clarifications to game history to which arenas are best for broadcasting and anything that anyone can think of. True to his broadcasting style, he always asks that fans give him their preferred pronunciation of their name.

In 2004, Kaiton was awarded the Foster Hewitt Memorial Award. This award, considered the equivalent of a Hall-of-Fame induction for broadcasters, is given for outstanding contributions to hockey broadcasting.

The Hurricanes usually piped a feed of Kaiton's radio broadcasts through the concourse of PNC Arena so fans wouldn't miss any action while away from their seats.

In July 2018, the Hurricanes tendered Kaiton a new contract offer that would have required him to take an 80 percent pay cut. Kaiton turned it down, ending his 39-year tenure with the Whalers/Hurricanes organization. The Hurricanes opted to simulcast the Fox Sports Carolinas television broadcast on the radio rather than hire a replacement for Kaiton.

Notable calls
Kaiton's best-known call is of Justin Williams' empty-net goal in game 7 of the 2006 Stanley Cup Finals, which sealed the Stanley Cup for the Hurricanes.

At the end of that game, Kaiton told the story of his career and the entire franchise to that point when he bellowed:

References

External links
  Kaiton's call of the goals and the final call of Game 7 of the 2006 Stanley Cup Finals

Living people
Year of birth missing (living people)
University of Michigan alumni
Carolina Hurricanes announcers
Foster Hewitt Memorial Award winners
Hartford Whalers announcers
National Hockey League broadcasters